Clogestone acetate (developmental code name AY-11440), also known as chlormadinol acetate or as 3β,17α-diacetoxy-6-chloropregna-4,6-diene-20-one, is a steroidal progestin which was investigated as a progestin-only contraceptive and postcoital contraceptive but was never marketed. It is the diacetate ester of clogestone, which, similarly was never marketed. Clogestone acetate produces chlormadinone acetate as an active metabolite.

See also
 List of progestogens
 List of progestogen esters

References

Abandoned drugs
Acetate esters
Organochlorides
Pregnanes
Progestogen esters
Progestogens